The S and T class was a class of sixteen destroyers of the Royal Navy launched in 1942–1943. They were built as two flotillas, known as the 5th and 6th Emergency Flotilla, and they served as fleet and convoy escorts in World War II.

Design features
The S class introduced the CP (central pivot) Mark XXII mounting for the QF Mark IX 4.7 in guns. This new mounting had a shield with a sharply raked front, to allow increased elevation (to 55 degrees), contrasting noticeably with the vertical front of the previous CP Mark XVIII, and easily differentiated the S class onwards from their immediate predecessors. Savage was the exception in this respect, being fitted with four 4.5 in guns; a twin mounting forward and two singles aft. These ships used the Fuze Keeping Clock HA Fire Control Computer.

The quadruple mounting Mark VII for the QF 2-pounder pom-poms was replaced by the twin mounting Mark IV for the 40 mm Bofors gun. Known as the "Hazemeyer" (or "Haslemere"), this advanced mounting was tri-axially stabilised in order that a target could be kept in the sights on the pitching deck of a destroyer and was fitted with an analog fire control computer and Radar Type 282, a metric range-finding set. The Hazemeyer design had been brought to Britain by the Dutch minelayer Willem van der Zaan that had escaped from the German occupation in May 1940.

The T class also was the first class to replace pole or tripod foremasts with lattice masts, which continued in subsequent War Emergency Flotillas.

Ships in class

S class

 (to Royal Dutch Navy as HNLMS Kortenaar, 1945)
 (to Royal Dutch Navy as HNLMS Evertsen, 1946)
 (to Royal Dutch Navy as HNLMS Piet Hein, 1945)
 (to Norway as ) (lost on 6 June 1944)
 (to Norway as )
 (lost on 24 June 1944)

T class

See also
Type 15 frigate: postwar full conversion of Wartime Emergency Programme destroyers into first-rate fast anti-submarine frigates
Type 16 frigate: postwar partial conversion of Wartime Emergency Programme destroyers into second-rate fast anti-submarine frigates

References

Publications

External links

Destroyer classes
 
Ship classes of the Royal Navy